James Duckworth was the defending champion but chose not to defend his title.

Matthew Ebden won the title after defeating Calvin Hemery 7–6(7–3), 6–3 in the final.

Seeds

Draw

Finals

Top half

Bottom half

References
Main Draw
Qualifying Draw

Dunlop World Challenge - Men's Singles
2017 Men's Singles